FnD gang was a small violent drug organization  in the Seventh Ward of New Orleans. The Frenchmen and Derbigny gang, or "FnD," operated from 2006 through 2013. The gang was most notable for the 2013 Mothers Day mass shooting that left 20 people wounded. The shooting made national headlines which led to a massive indictment on the gang in 2014.

Overview 
According to court documents, the FnD gang was an enterprise engaged in racketeering under federal law.  Members of this gang, conspired to commit numerous overt acts in furtherance of the gang's activities.  Gang members sold illegal drugs, such as heroin and crack cocaine, and they committed acts of violence, including shootings.  FnD members often sold drugs in the Frenchmen Meat Market, a convenience store located at the corner of Frenchmen and North Derbigny Streets. FnD members used intimidation, violence, and threats of violence to maintain the gang's control over turf that extended from Elysian Fields Avenue, North Johnson Street, the I-10 Interstate Highway, St. Anthony Street, and North Claiborne Avenue.
In 2012, FnD began feuding with two rival gangs known as the Desolnde Boys and PCB (Prieur and Columbus Boys). The feud resulted in multiple killings and shootings stemming from drugs according to Multi-Agency Gang Unit.

2013 mass shooting & indictment 
On May 12, 2013, at a second-line Mothers Day celebration, brothers Shawn and Akein Scott opened fire in a crowd striking 20 people. The shooting happened at the intersection of Frenchmen and North Villere streets. The area surrounding the intersection is where the FnD gang is known to sell drugs, according to sources familiar with the group. NOPD confirmed the hit was on there rivals in which they spotted in the crowd. Among the 20 shot was Leonard Epps, who suffered multiple gunshot wounds to his upper torso. Epps was confirmed as a member of there rival Deslonde Boys, in which authorities believed he was one of the intended targets.19 others suffered minor and life-threatening injuries. The two brothers were arrested and charged with 20-counts of attempted second-degree degree murder. 
In 2014 9 members were indictment on federal gun and drug charges including the Scott brothers. In 2015, Travis and Akein Scott pled guilty and were sentenced to life plus 10 years. While Shawn and Stanley Scott were each sentenced to 40 years, according to the U.S. Attorney's Office.

References 

Gangs